The Louisiana Department of Environmental Quality (LDEQ) is a state agency of Louisiana that monitors the environment of the state. It is headquartered in the Galvez Building in downtown Baton Rouge.

Structure 
The Department of Environmental Quality is split up into 5 sections:

 Office of the Secretary
 Office of Environmental Assessment
 Office of Environmental Compliance
 Office of Environmental Services
 Office of Management and Finance

History
The Stream Control Commission from 1940-1979 was the first regulatory commission dealing with water in Louisiana. Typed transcripts for each SCC meeting during the 1970s exist in the archives of the DEQ.The transcripts list each facility discussed at the meeting. "In most cases, the regulations are contained within the proceedings themselves."

The DEQ publishes annual reports since 2016.

See also
 Climate change in Louisiana

References

External links

 Louisiana Department of Environmental Quality

environment
State environmental protection agencies of the United States